is a former Japanese football player and manager.

Playing career
Ogawa was born in Shizuoka Prefecture on April 3, 1975. After graduating from Shimizu Commercial High School, he joined Kashima Antlers in 1994. However he could hardly play in the match. In June 1997, he moved to Kyoto Purple Sanga. Immediately he became a regular player as right side back. In 1999, he moved to Cerezo Osaka. Although he played many matches in 1999, he could hardly play in the match in 2000. In June 2000, he moved to J2 League club Shonan Bellmare and played as regular player. In 2001, he moved to Mito HollyHock. He played many matches in 2001 and became a regular player from 2002. In 2004, he moved to Japan Football League club Thespa Kusatsu. He played as regular player and the club won 3rd place in 2004 and was promoted to J2. In 2006, he moved to Regional Leagues club Zweigen Kanazawa and he played as playing manager. In 2007, he moved to Regional Leagues club FC Osaka. He retired end of 2007 season.

Coaching career
In 2006, when Ogawa was a player, he moved to Regional Leagues club Zweigen Kanazawa and he managed the club in 1 season as playing manager.

Club statistics

References

External links

kyotosangadc

1975 births
Living people
Association football people from Shizuoka Prefecture
Japanese footballers
J1 League players
J2 League players
Japan Football League players
Kashima Antlers players
Kyoto Sanga FC players
Cerezo Osaka players
Shonan Bellmare players
Mito HollyHock players
Thespakusatsu Gunma players
Zweigen Kanazawa players
FC Osaka players
Japanese football managers
Zweigen Kanazawa managers
Association football defenders